Dasapushpam ("dasha" meaning ten in Sanskrit and "pushpam" meaning flowers), or the ten sacred flowers of Kerala, are ten herbs traditionally significant to Keralites, the people of Kerala, India. These herbs are found almost everywhere in Kerala, especially in the Western Ghats region. They are used for decorative purposes, such as making the floral carpet pookalam during festivals like Onam. These ten flowers are also used to prepare folk medicines in Kerala.

List
The ten plants are:

Although the Malayalam names refer to the flowers, the medicinal value lies in the leaves in most cases.

Ipomoea sepiaria
Extracts of Ipomoea sepiaria leaves feature antimicrobial activity. The extract was tested on bacteria including Staphylococcus aureus, Klebsiella pneumoniae, Escherichia coli and Pseudomonas aeruginosa.

External links
 Photo Gallery of Dasapushpam
 More details about Dasapushpam in a website on Ayurveda.
 Details on Oil made with Dasapushpam

References